On May 18, 2018, a school shooting occurred at Santa Fe High School in Santa Fe, Texas, United States, in the Houston metropolitan area. Ten people – eight students and two teachers – were fatally shot, and thirteen others were wounded. Dimitrios Pagourtzis, a  student at the school, was taken into custody. At the time, the shooting was the third deadliest high school shooting in the United States (after the Stoneman Douglas High School shooting in 2018 and the Columbine High School massacre in 1999) and the deadliest in Texas.

Background 
The Santa Fe Independent School District has an active shooter plan, and two armed police officers that interacted with students in the school. In the year prior to the shooting, the school district leadership made plans to arm teachers and staff through the Texas School Marshal Program.

Shooting 

The gunman began firing a weapon into an art class at the school at 7:32 a.m. CDT. The incident occurred in the school's art complex, which consists of four interconnected rooms with interior hallways, and four other rooms. Witnesses said the two targeted classrooms are connected by a ceramics room that the shooter accessed by damaging a door window. During the shooting a staff member pulled a fire alarm, causing most of the school to evacuate.

One wounded victim told reporters the shooter walked into the classroom and pointed his firearm at another person, singing "Another One Bites the Dust" in between shots. According to a witness, students barricaded themselves in the art classroom storage closet but the shooter shot through the door with a shotgun. He left the art room briefly, causing students to leave the closet and attempt to barricade the art room door, but he pushed the door open. Upon spotting a student he knew, he said "Surprise!" and shot the student in the chest. Students are credited with giving victims first aid.

Santa Fe ISD Police officers stationed at the school exchanged fire with the shooter, with one officer being wounded and admitted in critical condition to a local hospital. After the gunman shot into the ceramics room, he was engaged by another school officer and a Texas Highway Patrol Trooper who attempted to have him surrender peacefully. He reportedly threatened to shoot the officers and repeatedly fired rounds while arguing with the police. He surrendered to the officers after being injured. The Galveston County Sheriff said officers confronted him within four minutes and allowed for the safe evacuation of other students and faculty.

Parents were kept off school grounds during the response to the shooting, with parents being directed to the Alamo gym by 8 AM. Students were then evacuated to the gym and reunited with their parents.

Victims
Ten people were killed and thirteen people were injured. The eight students and two teachers killed were:

Investigation 
The shooter told police he meant to kill the classmates he shot and wanted to spare the students he liked, so he could "have his story told". The shooting lasted about 25 minutes until he was arrested.

According to the probable cause affidavit and complaint filed by law enforcement, the shooter used a short-barreled 12-gauge Remington Model 870 pump-action shotgun and a Rossi .38-caliber snub-nosed revolver.  Both firearms appear to have been legally owned by his father.  Various types of explosive devices were found at the school and off campus, as well as a Molotov cocktail, and residents in the surrounding area were warned to be aware of all suspicious objects.

Two other people were detained by police as persons of interest. One was detained at the scene due to "suspicious reactions" after the shooting, and another was described as being interviewed.

Accused 
The suspected shooter was identified by police as Dimitrios Pagourtzis (born October 12, 2000), a 17-year-old student at the school. He is charged with capital murder of multiple people and aggravated assault against a public servant; and held in custody without bail. If convicted, he faces a maximum sentence of 40 years to life.

According to at least one witness, Pagourtzis was bullied by multiple students and coaches. The school denied the allegations of bullying by coaches. One of his former teachers described him as "quiet, but he wasn't quiet in a creepy way", and said that he had never seen him draw or write anything in his class journal that she found suspicious or unusual. Pagourtzis was on the honor roll, and he played on the school football team.

Pagourtzis's journals on his computer and cell phone, found by police after the shooting, suggested to Governor Greg Abbott "not only did he want to commit the shooting, but he wanted to commit suicide after the shooting, planned on doing this for some time. He advertised his intentions but somehow slipped through the cracks." Classmates recounted how at a water park the day before the shooting Pagourtzis did not show any signs of his plans, and seemed friendly and funny. Other classmates have called him a "weird loner" who "never seemed right".

The New York Times and Los Angeles Times highlighted Pagourtzis's social media presence. On April 30, Pagourtzis posted a photo of a shirt with the words "Born to Kill" on his Facebook page. The Facebook page also included photos of his black duster coat with several buttons on it, with an accompanying caption: "Hammer and Sickle=Rebellion. Rising Sun=Kamikaze Tactics. Iron Cross=Bravery. Baphomet=Evil. Cthulu=Power." The Facebook page has since been taken down.

Legal proceedings 
Pagourtzis was booked into the Galveston County Jail on two felony charges — capital murder of multiple people and aggravated assault against a police  officer. He was ordered held without bond. Pagourtzis is represented by attorneys hired by his parents. Due to his age, Pagourtzis is ineligible for the death penalty or life without parole. If convicted of capital murder, he faces a life sentence with parole eligibility after 40 years. Aggravated assault on a public servant carries a 5-99 year or 30 years to life sentence.

The defense team for Pagourtzis filed a change of venue request to move the trial out of Galveston County due to the publicity of the case. On February 27, 2019, a judge granted the request without specifying the new venue. In April 2019, it was announced that Pagourtzis would be facing 11 federal charges, despite a previous statement that federal charges would not be pursued. In June 2019, it was announced that the state trial would take place in Richmond in January 2020. 

However, on November 4, 2019, Pagourtzis was found by three experts to be unfit to stand trial. He has been in custody at North Texas State Hospital since that month; on March 11, 2020, after hospital experts submitted a report declaring that he was not competent, nor likely to become so in the next 90 days, Judge John Ellisor signed an order requiring him to remain in mental health treatment for at least 12 months. On February 11, 2022, Pagourtzis was again found incompetent to stand trial and was ordered to stay in the mental hospital for another 12 months.

Separate filings 
The parents of victim Chris Stone filed a lawsuit against Pagourtzis's parents, claiming that his father did not properly secure his weapons and that the parents were negligent in entrusting their son with the firearms. Under Texas law, guns cannot be made accessible to minors outside hunting or under parental supervision, and the penalty can be up to a year in jail and a $4,000 fine if the weapon causes serious injury or death. The parents of a second victim, Aaron McLeod, joined the lawsuit with additional allegations. Both families are also alleging that Pagourtzis's parents failed to obtain mental health counseling and support and to warn the public of his "dangerous propensities".

Aftermath 
Students organized a candlelight vigil on May 18. Ten white crosses were placed in front of the school to memorialize the deceased. The white crosses were removed prior to the start of the 2018–19 school year, and families of the victims were permitted to take home anything that was left for their family member at the makeshift memorial. President Trump ordered all U.S. flags flown at half-staff from May 18 until sunset on May 22. Blood drives were  set up to support the local hospitals. Houston Texans football player J. J. Watt offered to pay the funeral expenses of all the deceased. Local funeral homes, florists, and pastors offered heavily discounted or free rates for families of the deceased.

On May 26, 2018, multiple fundraisers were held. One local business sponsored a fundraiser that brought in $257,000 for the victims. In 2019, the Santa Fe 10 Memorial Foundation was organized to raise funds for a permanent memorial;  it had a $1.6 million goal. In 2019, partly in response to the Santa Fe High School shooting, the Texas Legislature allocated nearly $100 million to establish the Texas Child Mental Health Care Consortium.

The following Monday of the shooting, there were five arrests in the Greater Houston area for bringing weapons to school or making threats in the Friendswood, Huffman, Cleveland, Clear Creek, and Texas City Independent School Districts.

In July 2019 it emerged that David Briscoe, who had told reporters that he was a substitute at the school the day of the shooting, had lied about his actions. After the shooting, many sources including Time, CNN, and The Wall Street Journal ran stories about how Briscoe protected his students until first responders came. In April 2019, he did a follow-up interview with The Texas Tribune in which his claims included him moving to Florida, as he was haunted by the shooting. Upon further investigation by the reporter, it was discovered that Briscoe had never worked for the Santa Fe Independent School District, and upon the discovery that he had lied, Briscoe had since deleted several Twitter posts about his survival and the media outlets who published his account have removed them.

Reactions 
The residents of Santa Fe largely declined media attention and also did not support political gun control actions. After the shooting, the president of the school district's Board of Trustees said the district's policies and procedures worked, and that it was not the failure of the procedures that accounted for the incident, adding someone intent on entering the school to create havoc would be able to do so in any event.As a result of the shooting, the district planned to renovate the northwest area of the campus, including sealing off the art rooms in which the shooting occurred, as well as the adjacent hallway. A new hallway and counselor's office was to be installed. A new protection plan was unveiled for the 2018–2019 school year, with metal detectors at each entrance and police officers patrolling the campus with donated AR-15s equipped with rifle optics.

John Barnes, a police officer wounded in the shooting rampage, was hailed as a hero for tackling the shooter and saving many lives despite blood loss. The organizers of the March for Our Lives, from the Stoneman Douglas High School shooting three months earlier, tweeted "Though this is the 22nd school shooting this year, we urge those reading this not to sweep it under the rug and forget."

Pagourtzis's family 
In a published statement, Pagourtzis's family extended their prayers and condolences to the victims and thanked first responders for their assistance. According to the statement, they were as shocked by the event as everyone else. The family stated they were cooperating with authorities and requested the media and others to respect their privacy and that of the victims. While speaking to reporters, Pagourtzis's father, an immigrant from Greece, claimed that his son's history of being bullied was the reason for the shooting.

Political 
U.S. President Donald Trump expressed his condolences in a press conference shortly following the shootings, and said his "administration is determined to do everything in [its] power to protect our students". On May 31, Trump met with victims, families, and others affected, to discuss the event and trying to find prevention methods.

Secretary of Education Betsy DeVos said, "Our schools must be safe and nurturing environments for learning. No student should have to experience the trauma suffered by so many today and in similar events prior. We simply cannot allow this trend to continue."

Texas Governor Greg Abbott said in a press briefing that the attack was "one of the most heinous attacks that we've ever seen in the history of Texas schools." He also said that the shooter wanted to commit suicide later in the incident and called for all Texans to hold a moment of silence on May 21 at 10:00 AM CDT in honor of the victims, their families and first responders. Texas Lieutenant Governor Dan Patrick said the design of Texas schools with "too many entrances and too many exits" may have to be reconsidered. He said the issue is "not about the guns, it's about us."

See also 

 List of school shootings in the United States

References

External links
 

2018 active shooter incidents in the United States
2018 crimes in Texas
2018 mass shootings in the United States
Attacks in the United States in 2018
Deaths by firearm in Texas
High school shootings in the United States
Mass shootings in Texas
Mass shootings in the United States
May 2018 crimes in the United States
Santa Fe, Texas
School massacres in the United States
School shootings committed by pupils